Joseph L. Osterman is a retired U.S. Marine
lieutenant general who served as the commander of the I Marine Expeditionary Force.

Marine career
Osterman was commissioned in the United States Marine Corps as a second lieutenant through the Naval Reserve Officers Training Corps (NROTC) at the University of Colorado in 1982. He graduated from The Basic School and the Infantry Officers Course, then received assignment as rifle platoon commander and 81 mm mortar platoon commander with 1st Battalion, 7th Marines. He then served as executive officer of the Marine Detachment aboard the USS Kennedy (CV-67), then as commanding officer of the Marine Detachment aboard the USS Forrestal. He served as an operations officer with 1st Battalion, 2nd Marines. As a lieutenant colonel, Osterman was the commanding officer of 1st Battalion, 3rd Marines and participated in support of Operation Enduring Freedom. This was followed by a joint tour as an instructor and as the chief of staff, NATO School, Oberammergau, Germany, where he was responsible for training support to some 54 nations. Following his promotion to Colonel, Osterman assumed command of 25th Marine Regiment in 2004 and deployed to Iraq as an adviser to the Iraqi army. In June 2006 Osterman became director of the Expeditionary Warfare School till 2008 and followed by assignment as assistant division commander, 2nd Marine Division. In March 2010, he deployed to Afghanistan as commanding general, 1st Marine Division.

His joint assignments include the International Security Assistance Force Joint Command Deputy Chief of Staff of Operations, Afghanistan, and as Instructor and Chief of Staff at the NATO School, Oberammergau, Germany. As a brigadier general, Osterman served as commanding general of the Marine Corps Recruiting Command from 2011-2012. As a major general, Osterman assumed command of Marine Corps Forces Special Operations Command in August 2014 till August 2016. Upon promotion to lieutenant general, Osterman served as Deputy Commander of the United States Special Operations Command, MacDill Air Force Base, Florida. Osterman's final assignment before retirement was Commanding General, I Marine Expeditionary Force from July 2018 to 31 July 2020.

Post-retirement
In June 2022, Osterman was among five senior Marine and Navy officers who were censured by Secretary of the Navy Carlos Del Toro for failing to prevent the July 2020 AAV sinking incident that killed eight Marines and one Navy sailor.

Awards and decorations

References

1960 births
United States Marine Corps personnel of the Gulf War
United States Marine Corps personnel of the Iraq War
United States Marine Corps personnel of the War in Afghanistan (2001–2021)
Living people
People from Anne Arundel County, Maryland
Recipients of the Defense Distinguished Service Medal
Recipients of the Defense Superior Service Medal
Recipients of the Legion of Merit